Chonburi Football Club is a Thai football club based in Chonburi. The club was founded in 1997 and has competed in the Thai football league system since 2002. They entered the first AFC Champions League in 2008, and entered the first AFC Cup in 2009.

History

First Champions League
Chonburi played in the first AFC Champions League in 2008, drawn against Japanese champions Gamba Osaka. On March 20, 2008 the club achieved its first victory in the AFC Champions League against the highly fancied Melbourne Victory.  The game was clouded by controversy when Melbourne Victory scored their only goal whilst a Chonburi FC player was down injured and his teammates were calling for the ball to be played off the park. It mattered little when Cameroonian striker Baga scored a goal from 35 yards out and then followed it up with a second goal in extra time to condemn the Melbourne Victory to their first loss in the competition 3-1.

First AFC Cup

Matches

2008 AFC Champions League

2009 AFC Cup

Round of 16

Quarter-finals

Bình Dương won 4–2 on aggregate.

2011 AFC Cup

Round of 16

Quarter-finals

1–1 on aggregate; Nasaf Qarshi won on penalties.

All the matches was laid in Chonburi Municipality Stadium not IPE Stadium.

Overall record

By competition

By country

References

Asia